Sphaerodactylus streptophorus, also known as the Hispaniola least gecko or Hispaniolan small-eared sphaero, is a small species of gecko endemic to Hispaniola.

References

Sphaerodactylus
Endemic fauna of Hispaniola
Reptiles described in 1977